Ruth of the Rockies is a 1920 American silent Western film serial directed by George Marshall. Two of the 15 episodes survive in the UCLA Film and Television Archive.

Plot
As described in a film magazine, in New York City breezy Bab Murphy (Roland) comes into possession of a trunk with the insignia of the Inner Circle, a gang of crooks, who have their headquarters in Dusty Bend along the Mexican border but also operate in New York. The gang trails the trunk to ownership by Bab and, for it and a jade ring that is mysteriously sent to her, a series of adventures begin as she heads for the Bend.

Members of the gang throw the trunk off a train into the California desert where it is picked up by two accomplices in an automobile, only to have an aviator who flies low enough to overpower them and intercept the trunk by taking their place at the wheel. This birdman of mystery will later save Bab from the enforced marriage to a member of the gang, and by the third episode saves her from being imprisoned on the narrow balcony of a high tower.

Cast
 Ruth Roland as Bab Murphy
 Herbert Heyes as Justin Garret
 Thomas G. Lingham as Edward Dugan
 Jack Rollens as Sam Wilkes
 Fred Burns as Burton
 William Gillis as Pendleton Pete
 Gilbert Holmes as Shorty (credited as Pee Wee Holmes)
 Norma Bichole
 Harry Maynard
 S.J. Bingham
 Al Hoxie (Extra / stunts) (uncredited)

Chapter titles
 The Mysterious Trunk
 The Inner Circle
 The Tower of Danger
 Between Two Fires
 Double Crossed
 The Eagle's Nest
 Troubled Waters
 Danger Trails
 The Perilous Path
 Outlawed
 The Fatal Diamond
 The Secret Order
 The Surprise Attack
 The Secret of Regina Island
 The Hidden Treasure

See also
 List of film serials
 List of film serials by studio

References

External links

 

1920 films
1920 Western (genre) films
1920 lost films
American silent serial films
American black-and-white films
Pathé Exchange film serials
Films directed by George Marshall
Lost Western (genre) films
Lost American films
Films based on works by Johnston McCulley
Silent American Western (genre) films
1920s American films